AGBU Alex and Marie Manoogian School is a charter K-12 Armenian school in Southfield, Michigan in Metro Detroit. It is affiliated with Armenian General Benevolent Union (AGBU).

Central Michigan University is the charter overseer.

History
In 1969 it was established in as a private school. Its initial student body was 20, and it had two teachers. It was named for Alex and Marie Manoogian.

It included a high school program, with the first graduating class in 1978, but suspended its high school in 1991 due to an enrollment decline. In 1995 it became a charter school; that year it had 170 students. At the time Nadya Sarafian was the principal.

The Southfield Observer & Eccentric stated that the school re-established its high school after receiving "overwhelming demand" to do so, with the first new high school class graduating in 2000.

In 1995 and 2001, the Governor of Michigan awarded the school the Golden Apple Award for Academic Excellence.  Manoogian had 370 students.

Louise Manoogian Simone and Richard Manoogian, the children of Alex and Marie Manoogian, donated funds for an expansion and renovation in 2004 and later donated additional funds when the project found additional expenses. A new high school facility opened in 2009.  it had about 55 employees and more than 400 students.

In 2009 principal Hosep Torossian stated that the school had a budget, almost entirely sourced from funds from the State of Michigan, of fewer than $3,000,000.

References

External links

 AGBU Alex and Marie Manoogian School
 AGBU Alex and Marie Manoogian School - Armenian General Benevolent Union

Southfield, Michigan
Charter schools in Michigan
Armenian-American private schools
Armenian schools
Public K–8 schools in Michigan
Public K-12 schools in Michigan
Private K-12 schools in Michigan
Private K–8 schools in the United States
Charter K-12 schools in the United States
1969 establishments in Michigan
Educational institutions established in 1969